Francesco Dezulian (29 August 1908 – 27 December 1979) was an Italian cross-country skier. He competed in the men's 50 kilometre event at the 1932 Winter Olympics.

References

External links
 

1908 births
1979 deaths
Italian male cross-country skiers
Olympic cross-country skiers of Italy
Cross-country skiers at the 1932 Winter Olympics
Sportspeople from Trentino